Meadowbrook is a Syracuse, New York neighborhood, located in the southeastern corner of the city. It corresponds to Onondaga County Census Tract 46. It is named after Meadow Brook, which runs through it and into Butternut Creek.

Borders

Its northern border runs along Salt Springs and Springfield Roads to the north, where it borders the Salt Springs neighborhood. To the west, its borders are Westmoreland Avenue, Cumberland Avenue, and Nottingham Road, where it borders the Westcott and University neighborhoods. To the south and east the neighborhood borders the Town of DeWitt.

Streets

Meadowbrook is bisected by New York State Route 92, East Genesee Street. Other major roads in the neighborhood include Meadowbrook Drive, Euclid Avenue, and Hillsboro Parkway. Most streets do not have sidewalks, although there are plans to install some.

Education

Le Moyne College, Syracuse's second-largest college, is located in Meadowbrook's northeast corner. Nottingham High School is located on East Genesee Street, near the center of the neighborhood. There are two primary schools: H.W. Smith School, and Solace Elementary School. The Manlius Pebble Hill School, an independent pre-K to 12 school is located near the neighborhood, in DeWitt.

Retail

There is not much retail located in Meadowbrook. Nottingham Plaza (with about 10 small stores, including Ace Hardware and Bruegger's Bagels) and P&C Plaza are in its southwest corner near/on the border with DeWitt. Just east of Meadowbrook, in DeWitt, exists Shoppingtown Mall, one of the three largest malls in the region. Just off Meadowbrook is the Syracuse Real Food Co-op, Syracuse's only cooperatively owned grocery store.

Characteristics

Meadowbrook is one of the wealthiest neighborhoods in Syracuse, with suburban-style housing, as a result of which it is sometimes referred to as "the suburb in the city."  80.7 percent of housing in the neighborhood is owner-occupied, about twice the citywide average. As of 2010-2014 Census information, 5,202 people lived in Meadowbrook.  From that same period, the median household income for the neighborhood was $73,000.  Registered voters are 54% Democrat, 19% Republican, 21% non-enrolled, and 5% percent other.

The Ashton House, Harry N. Burhans House, Fuller House, Hoeffer House, Poehlman House, Sanderson House at 112 Scottholm Terrace, Sanderson House at 301 Scottholm Boulevard, Scottholm Tract Historic District, and Louis and Celia Skoler Residence are listed on the National Register of Historic Places.

References

External links
 Official Syracuse Neighborhood Information, Including Meadowbrook

Neighborhoods in Syracuse, New York